Subenrat Insaeng (born 10 February 1994) is a Thai athlete specialising in the discus throw. She has won multiple medals on regional level.

Her personal best in the event is 61.97 metres set in Kolin[cze]in 2018. This is the current national record.

Competition record

References

1994 births
Living people
Subenrat Insaeng
Athletes (track and field) at the 2014 Asian Games
Athletes (track and field) at the 2018 Asian Games
Athletes (track and field) at the 2010 Summer Youth Olympics
Subenrat Insaeng
Athletes (track and field) at the 2016 Summer Olympics
Subenrat Insaeng
Southeast Asian Games medalists in athletics
Subenrat Insaeng
Competitors at the 2011 Southeast Asian Games
Competitors at the 2013 Southeast Asian Games
Competitors at the 2015 Southeast Asian Games
Competitors at the 2017 Southeast Asian Games
Subenrat Insaeng
Competitors at the 2019 Southeast Asian Games
Competitors at the 2013 Summer Universiade
Competitors at the 2015 Summer Universiade
Competitors at the 2019 Summer Universiade
Subenrat Insaeng
Athletes (track and field) at the 2020 Summer Olympics
Competitors at the 2021 Southeast Asian Games
Subenrat Insaeng